Bochnia Commune is a gmina ("commune" or "municipality") within Lesser Poland Voivodeship in the south of Poland. It is situated on the borderline between two geographical regions: the Sandomierz Basin (Kotlina Sandomierska) in the northern part of the commune's territory, and the Wieliczka Piedmont (Pogórze Wielickie) in the southern part. 

The commune consists of 31 townships and covers an area of 131 km2.  the number of residents was 19,358. Its territory extends over about 50 km along the Raba and Stradomka rivers and their tributaries. The commune is cut almost in half by the E40 Dresden-Kraków-Lvov International Road, a railway line and, in the near future, the A-4 highway. The international Kraków-Balice airport is 40 km away.

The area contains flat fields and meadows of the Raba river valley in the north, including the Niepołomice Forest (Puszcza Niepołomicka); and a mountainous area in the south, within visual range of the Beskid Wyspowy mountain range, and in good weather, also the Tatra and Pieniny mountain ranges.

History
Considering the historical attractiveness, Bochnia Commune belongs to the most interesting districts in the Lesser Poland (Małopolska). Early settlements dating back to the prehistoric domain of Vistulians (Wiślanie) flourished in two neighboring centers: Łapczyca and Chełm. Łapczyca (in Latin referred to as: Labscicia et cum sole - Łapczyca with salt) was mentioned in Cardinal Idzi's edict of 1105 as the property of the Tyniec Benedictine Monastery. Łapczyca is a village of the longest unwritten history in the region, one of the oldest villages in southern Poland and also one of the most significant early settlements in the Bochnia region. There are some traces of a medieval fortified castle (grodzisko) which enjoyed its magnificence from the 9th through 11th centuries. A site of the greatest historic value is a gothic church founded by King Casimir the Great (Kazimierz Wielki) in 1360 as an expiatory gift. Since 1849 pilgrimages from Bochnia to the Łapczyca historic church are held annually in order to commemorate the town's miraculous salvation from an epidemics of cholera.
Monachus - the Patriarch of Jerusalem is the author of a document dated 1198, confirming that a magnate - Mikora of the Gryfit Family - donated the Chełm village to the Friars of the Equestrian Order of the Holy Sepulchre of Jerusalem based at Miechów along with the feudal dues (dziesięcina - the tenth part of a serf s income due to the feudal lord), village fair and even 'karczma' - the local inn. Salt - the greatest natural wealth of the region - was discovered in consequence of their activities and, in effect, led to the foundation of the town of Bochnia operating in compliance with Magdeburg law from 1253. 
Since 1999 the Parish Museum of the Equestrian Order of the Holy Sepulchre (Bożogrobcy) has been operating at Chełm. Its founder and custodian is the parish priest of the local church under the invocation of St. John the Baptist - Rev. Antoni Tworek. The most valuable exhibits are gold and silver embroidered chasubles dating from the 17th through 19th centuries, a monstrance and an alms-box dating from the 17th and 18th centuries. Some of the exhibits are stored at the local belfry. Since 2004 the museum has been acting as the premises of the "Chełm" Art Gallery. Every year a great outdoor event is organized at Chełm - Wianki Świętojańskie (floating wreaths on the Raba river on St. John's Eve), which combines some elements of pagan beliefs with the Christian tradition of St. John's holiday.
In the northern part of the commune's territory, at Bessów, some traces of early settlements dating back to the 4th and 5th centuries AD were preserved - some pottery and primitive smelting furnaces used for iron metallurgical processing and primitive farm tools production. In the 1970s numerous sensational archeological discoveries were made re, which turned the village into a researchers' "El Dorado". According to a legend, some Tartar warriors who invaded Poland during the Crimean 13th century settled at Cerekwia.
Brzeźnica is another very old village (first chronicled in 1242). It is situated in the eastern part of the commune's territory. From 1242 onwards it enjoyed municipal rights for a few years. According to a legend, St. Stanisław of Szczepanów, then the Bishop of Cracow, was persecuted by King Boleslaus the Bold and had to escape from Kraków. City residents refused to give him water and accommodation. Having spent the night on a haystack, he raised his hands to heaven, prayed and hit the ground with his truncheon. Since that time, a spring of cristal clear water, regarded as 'miraculous' by the local people, has been gushing at the site. Other historic localities are: Krzyżanowice, Nieszkowice, Bogucice, Pogwizdów and Stanisławice situated at the fringe of the Niepołomice Virgin Forest (Puszcza Niepołomicka). The forest was first mentioned in a document of 1242, where it was referred to as "the Kłaj Forest" (Las Kłaj). In 1393 it was referred to as "the Niepołomice Forest" (Las Niepołomicki), and in 1441 the name "Niepołomice Virgin Forest" (Puszcza Niepołomicka) was used for the first time. The name "niepołomicka" derives from an old Polish word "niepołomny" which denoted something hard, unbreakable or indestructible. Throughout Poland's history the forest belonged to me State Treasury. For years it was an excellent hunting area used by the Polish kings. A forest trail called "the Royal Route" was used by the hunting kings, penetrating deep into the forest: Casimir the Great (Kazimierz Wielki), Ladislaus Jagiełło (Władysław Jagiełło), Sigismund the Old (Zygmunt Stary), Sigismund Augustus (Zygmunt August), Stephen Bathory (Stefan Batory) or Augustus III of Saxony (August III Sas). Big game was hunted for at the time: bear, wild pig, aurochs, moose, deer, bison and wolf.
During the partitions, 'work at the foundations' characterized the localities neighboring Bochnia. Most of their inhabitants contributed to the restitution of Poland's sovereignty with their military effort and the sacrifice of their lives. An obelisk in the centre of Łapczyca is memorial to the personage of Józef Chwałkowski, who was killed in the January Uprising of 1863. The history of Gawłów is also extremely interesting. Until 1945 he village had been inhabited by former German colonists and their descendants who settled there after the first Partition of Poland. Until World War II, at the neighboring Majkowice village, there had even been a German school. Another fact worth attention, is that the Polish and German communities coexisted here for one and a half century in full harmony and mutual respect. During World War II the region of Bochnia experienced many tragic events. On 10 September 1939 the region's biggest battle took place at the fringe of fringe Niepołomice Virgin Forest (Puszcza Niepołomicka). Over 50 soldiers of the Kraków Army (Armia Kraków) were killed in the strife. Another local drama was shooting by the Germans of over 500 Jews at Baczków - by way of liquidation of the Bochnia's ghetto as of 25 August 1942. Today the monuments at the fringe of the forest testify to the fact. The Pilots' Monument erected at Nieszkowice Wielkie reminds us of the heroic "Liberator" team, who were killed on their attempt to help the fighting soldiers of the Warsaw Uprising. On the eve of the Liberation Day, in January 1945, Germans pacified the Grabina village and shot many residents.

Tourism

Via Regia Antiqua
The most interesting tourist trail of Bochnia Commune is the ancient royal route 'Via Regia Antiqua'. This historic trail is a section of the Amber Route also referred to as the Royal Route. As early as the 12th century it served the function of a transport and trade artery linking Europe with Rus and Hungary. Merchant caravans used to pass the way with wagons loaded with Bochnia's salt, Flandrian cloth, Baltic amber, copper and Hungarian wine. Also princes' or kings' retinues, heading for the capital city in the nearby Kraków could be encountered there. The Route proceeds from Bochnia via two ancient localities of Łapczyca and Chełm and, lastly, Moszczenica characterized with wild landscape. Formerly, fine vineyards were spreading across the area, which is commemorated by the name of the local hill - "Vineyard" (Winnica), preserved until today.
This unique route allows the visitor to admire simultaneously the panorama of the Raba River Gorge, the Niepołomice Virgin Forest (Puszcza Niepołomicka) as well as the Beskid Wyspowy and Tatras mountain ranges.
Numerous interesting sites are situated at the Route: "A gothic church at Łapczyca, dating from 1340, founded by King Casimir the Great (Kazimierz Wielki) - according to a legend - as a penance for his love affair with Esther (Esterka) - a beautiful Jewish girl from Kazimierz. Until 1733 the temple had served the function of a parish church. At the beginning of the 19th century the temple was closed down and partly devastated by plunderers who were looking for treasures there. At present, it functions as a chapel. Originally, it was a double-chamber edifice with stellar vaults (lierne vaults) supported by two pillars - at present replaced with apparent vaults. At the entrance there are pointed-arch portals dating back to the 15th century. The church is encircled by old linden trees (natural monuments). Next to the church there is an 18th-century chamber belfry. Every year in July this beautiful temple is revived, when on the holiday of Our Lady of Mount Carmel a pilgrimage arrives from Bochnia to commemorate the miraculous salvation from the epidemics of cholera in 1849.

Rest and recreational centers
Hospice and Ski-Lift at Wola Nieszkowska
The hospice located at the village (10 km away from Bochnia) is situated about 350 meters above sea level. It is open all year long and it has 20 bedrooms, a kitchen, a fireplace room,  club-room and also a barbecue and fire spot. Next to the hospice, along the northern slope, of around 500 meters' length, there is a trapeze ski-lift. In winter the ski-slope is illuminated and artificially snowed. One can get there by bus (municipal line No 2), which takes about 15 minutes, or in one's own car. There are two car-parks prepared for tourists: at the top of the hill next to the hospice and at the foot of the hill next to the ski-lift.

Indoor swimming pool
At Proszówki, next to the 'Bochnia-Zielona' public road No 965, there is a modern sports and education center, comprising an indoor swimming pool heated by solar collectors (the only facility of this kind in the whole Lesser Poland /Małopolska) and a complex of sport fields and tennis courts. In winter an artificially refrigerated ice-rink (the only in the region) and a skate rental agency are open there. The complex also possesses a hotel infrastructure enabling the organization of the so-called 'green school' camps. The swimming pool complex is not a large, but a very modern facility.
The main pool, measuring 25m x 12.5m (6 lanes), 1.2m - 1.8m deep, holds a Polish Swimming Federation certificate authorizing the organization of swimming contests there. Varied depth levels enable the organization of swimming classes for beginners and guarantee security to all users. 
The recreational pool, measuring 12m x 6m, provides good fun and relaxation. It has been equipped with needle bath, particularly useful for rehabilitation purposes. Its warmer water especially attracts the youngest. The rehabilitation pool (jacuzzi) for 12 persons is filled with iodide-bromine brine from the Łapczyca deposit. It also possesses some intensive aqua-massage equipment. A 48 meters' long water slide is an extra attraction.  The facility possesses an impressive car-park. Transport by public buses (line 7) from the center of Bochnia.

Neptun fishery
At Nieprześnia, next to the 'Pogwizdów Sobolów' public road, there is a fishery providing agrotourist services. At the site visitors can enjoy fishing, use aqua bikes or boa; and, in the evening, they can feast on fried Nearby, in the former manor park there conference-recreational center with 50 hotel rooms The renovated Nieprześnia and Zawada manor; houses exemplify perfect harmony of architecture and landscape.

Cycling routes
The beauty of the 'Bochnia' land can be admired during cycling trips. The following routes are especially worth recommending: 
-The so-called "Upper Highway" (Górny Gościniec), proceeding from Bochnia via Łapczyca to Chełm; from where one can admire the Raba River meanders and the Niepołomice Virgin Forest (Puszcza Niepołomicka).
-The 'Czyżyczka-Berdychów' public road, linking Gierczyce and Pogwizdów, from where 
a fascinating panorama of the Beskid Wyspowy Mountains and the ancient Via Regia Antiqua route can be observed.
-The 'Gorzków-Brzeźnica' loessic gorge, whose unique mood attracts crowds of cyclists and tourists.
- The 'Buczyna-Stradomka' public road descending from Borek Hill (Góra Borek) down a very steep slope. The emotions induced and the beautiful views observed will make the site well-planted in tourists' memory.
-The cycling routes around the Niepołomice Virgin Forest and forest cuttings are excellent sites for cycling sports and biology classes.

Villages
Gmina Bochnia contains the villages and settlements of Baczków, Bessów, Bogucice, Brzeźnica, Buczyna, Cerekiew, Chełm, Cikowice, Dąbrowica, Damienice, Gawłów, Gierczyce, Gorzków, Grabina, Krzyżanowice, Łapczyca, Majkowice, Moszczenica, Nieprześnia, Nieszkowice Małe, Nieszkowice Wielkie, Ostrów Szlachecki, Pogwizdów, Proszówki, Siedlec, Słomka, Stanisławice, Stradomka, Wola Nieszkowska, Zatoka and Zawada.

Neighbouring gminas
Gmina Bochnia is bordered by the town of Bochnia and by the gminas of Drwinia, Rzezawa, Łapanów, Kłaj, Gdów, Nowy Wiśnicz, Trzciana

References

 Gmina Bochnia - aktualności

Bochnia
Bochnia County
Holocaust locations in Poland